Lime Street  is a street in the central business district of Sydney in New South Wales, Australia. It stretches from  King Street near Darling Harbour in the south and extends slightly north of the end of Erskine Street. 

It is in a former maritime industrial area on the eastern shore of Darling Harbour which is undergoing an extensive redevelopment.

Lime Street is an eastern boundary of the commercial waterfront development of the King Street Wharf.

See also

References

Streets in Sydney
Sydney central business district